List of airports in Korea may refer to:

List of airports in North Korea
List of airports in South Korea